Events in the year 1659 in Portugal.

Incumbents
King: Alfonso VI

Events
January 14 - Battle of the Lines of Elvas

References

 
1650s in Portugal
Portugal